The Tower of Miomu is a Genoese tower located in the commune of Santa-Maria-di-Lota (Haute-Corse) on the east coast of the Corsica. The tower sits on the shore about 6 km north of the port of Bastia.

The tower was built in 1561. It was one of a series of coastal defences built by the Republic of Genoa between 1530 and 1620 to stem the attacks by Barbary pirates. 
It guarded the Poggiolo valley on Cap Corse.
In 1927 the tower was listed as one of the official historical monuments of France.

See also
List of Genoese towers in Corsica

Notes and references

External links

 Includes information on how to reach 90 towers and many photographs.

Towers in Corsica
Monuments historiques of Corsica